Construcciones y Auxiliar de Ferrocarriles (Grupo CAF, literally "Construction and Other Railway Services") is a Spanish publicly listed company which manufactures railway vehicles and equipment and buses through its Solaris Bus & Coach subsidiary. It is based in Beasain, Basque Autonomous Community, Spain. Equipment manufactured by Grupo CAF includes light rail vehicles, rapid transit trains, railroad cars and locomotives, as well as variable gauge axles that can be fitted on any existing truck or bogie.

Over the 20 years from the early 1990s, CAF benefited from the rail investment boom in its home market in Spain to become a world player with a broad technical capability, able to manufacture almost any type of rail vehicle. CAF has supplied railway rolling stock to a number of major urban transit operators around Europe, the US, South America, East Asia, India, Australia and North Africa.

History

CAF was an acronym for the earlier name of Compañía Auxiliar de Ferrocarriles, as well as for Construcciones y Auxiliar de Ferrocarriles.

Fábrica de Hierros San Martín
In 1860, Domingo Goitia, Martín Usabiaga and José Francisco Arana established this company, whose main activity was puddling furnaces and cylinder rolling.

La Maquinista Guipuzcoana
In 1892, Francisco de Goitia (Domingo Goitia's son and heir) joined the Marquess of Urquijo to set up La Maquinista Guipuzcoana, whose main activity was the operation of machinery and the forging and construction of railway rolling stock.

In 1898, it set up its plant in Beasain, Gipuzkoa. In 1905 it changed its name to Fábrica de Vagones de Beasain (FVB).

Compañía Auxiliar de Ferrocarriles
Compañía Auxiliar de Ferrocarriles (CAF) was founded in 1917, specializing in freight car production and with a total of 1,600 employees.

In 1940, the Irun factory was set up, following the expansion of activity after the Spanish Civil War (CAF took part in reconstructing the Spanish rail fleet).

In 1954, CAF took over Material Móvil y Construcciones (MMC) from Zaragoza (Aragon), a company with extensive experience in manufacturing long-distance and subway trains.

Since 1958, the company has modernized and enlarged its Beasain plant and expanded its activity to include all kinds of rolling stock. In line with this, in 1969 CAF created its Research and Development Unit, which increased the company's competitiveness and intensified the focus on in-house technology.

Construcciones y Auxiliar de Ferrocarriles
In 1971, the existing Compañía Auxiliar de Ferrocarriles (CAF) merged with Material Móvil y Construcciones (MMC) and the company adopted its current name Construcciones y Auxiliar de Ferrocarriles.

Subsidiaries
CAF U.S.A., a wholly owned subsidiary of CAF, was incorporated in 1998 and is based in Elmira, New York.  It manufactures rolling stock for the North American market at a plant in Elmira that the company acquired from ADtranz in 2000. The company from Beasain continued its expansion during the third millennium.

On 24 May 2019, it announced the acquisition of the Swedish company Euromaint at a cost of circa €80 million, following other international contracts to supply Flemish and English railway and underground networks in 2017.

CAF Rolling Stock U.K. Ltd. is the CAF subsidiary in the United Kingdom. Its factory is based at Celtic Springs Business Park, at Llanwern steelworks near Newport, Wales as a result of an agreement made between CAF and the Welsh Government. The Newport factory has built stock for Transport for Wales, Arriva Rail North, the Docklands Light Railway, and potentially High Speed 2 if CAF win the bid process.

CAF Signalling was fined in 2021 with 1.7 million euros by the Spanish commission on markets and competition because of its participation in a cartel with other 7 international companies which colluded in tenders over Spanish rail infrastructure.

Train defects

In April 2014, two carriages of an Urbos 3 tram in Belgrade separated during passenger service, due to the cracking of screws connecting the cars. Half of the Belgrade tramway's CAF fleet were found to have been affected by similar cracking of screws in the two weeks prior to the incident.

In March 2016, 19 British Rail Class 332 units were taken out of service after a crack was discovered in the underframe of one unit during routine maintenance.

In December 2017, the Besançon Tramway in Besançon, France discovered cracks in their Urbos 3s vehicles around the bogie box area of the bodies, which in December 2020 CAF paid for remedial work to be performed with each unit affected requiring one month downtime for the work to be completed.

In April 2021, 22 British Rail Class 195 Civity units were temporarily removed from service after routine maintenance revealed a yaw damper bracket had detached from the body of unit 195121.

On June 11, 2021, West Midlands Metro (operating between Birmingham and Wolverhampton, England) were forced to suspend their services due to similar cracks being discovered in the bogie box areas of their Urbos 3s vehicles, with ongoing investigations continuing to identify any other issues relating to the cracks and to find options for remedial works to be performed. Full service only began once more in February 2022.

On June 24, 2021, Flytoget were forced to withdraw their entire CAF Oaris fleet after 19 days of service due to the discovery of cracks in the chassis. They remain out of service as of September 2022, with plans to reinstate them by the end of the year. In the meantime, CAF has paid an unknown amount to Flytoget in compensation.

Following on from these instances, in November 2021 the New South Wales transport minister Rob Stokes announced that the Sydney L1 Dulwich Hill Line would be decommissioned for up to 18 months, due to serious design flaws in all 12 of the CAF Urbos 3s tram sets that were running on the line. Stokes stated that the flaws (in the bogie boxes) were likely to be far broader in scope than those identified in Sydney due to the thousands of the same tram type operated around the world.

In March 2022, the West Midlands Metro was again forced to suspend its services due to the discovery of more cracks, this time on the bodywork of the trams.

In February 17, 2023, the Department of Transportation of the Philippines revealed that nearly 80 of the new light rail vehicles for Manila's LRT Line 1 cannot be used due to water leaks in the cars.

In February 2023, CAF revealed that the 2020 project for 31 trains for the FEVE narrow-gauge lines in the northern regions of Cantabria and Asturias, Spain, asked for a carriage width that would not fit through the existing 19th-century tunnels. The change in specifications will delay the established delivery date of October 2024 by two years to 2026.

Political activity
During the 2019 United Kingdom general election, CAF Rail UK Limited made a donation of £50,000 to the Conservative Party.
 In 2019, it entered into litigation that affects its corporate image. Participating in a consortium, JNET, together with the Israeli company Shapir Engineering and Industry, has won a tender promoted by the Israeli Ministry of Transport and Road Safety to supply railway equipment, in addition to building, extending and operating light rail lines from Jerusalem to nearby settlements in disputed territories, in violation of the Fourth Geneva Convention. In turn, Shapir is on the list of companies that benefit from the occupation in the Occupied Palestinian Territories, as denounced by the United Nations Human Rights Council.

Rolling stock

Carriages 
 Mark 4
 Mark 5 
 Mark 5A
 Amtrak Viewliner II

EMU and DMU 

 Cepia
 Oaris
 Class 598
 IZBAN E22000
 TRD
 TEMD
 TDMD
 Class 440
 Class 444
 Civity
 Sprinter New Generation
 Civia 
 Class 446/447
 IE 29000 Class
 AM class EMU, Auckland
 VR Class Sm4
 MTR Adtranz-CAF EMU

Locomotives
 Class 250
 Class 252

For FEVE, now part of Renfe Operadora:
 Electro-diesel locomotive Class 1900
 Class 2600 DMU
 Class 2700 DMU
 Class 2900 DMU

For Euskotren:
 UT200
 UT300
 UT900
 UT950
 UT3500
 Euskotren XXI

For Serveis Ferroviaris de Mallorca:
 DMU Class 61
 EMU Class 71
 EMU Class 81

For other operators:
 BITRAC CC 3600 (Class 601) electro-diesel (Ordered by FESUR, currently operated by Captrain España)

Metro 
For Madrid:
 Class 300
 Class 1000
 Class 2000
 Class 3000
 Class 5000
 Class 6000
 Class 8000
 Class 8400

For Barcelona:

 Class 1000
 Class 2000
 Class 3000
 Class 4000
 Class 5000
 Class 6000
 Class S/2100
 Class S/300
For Helsinki:
 M300

For Bucharest:
 BM3

For Amsterdam:
 Metromaterieel S3/M4
 Metromaterieel M7/M8

For Brussels:

Trams 
 Urbos 1 (Tranvía de Bilbao)
 Urbos 2 (Tranvía de Vélez-Málaga, Tranvía de Vitoria and Metro de Sevilla).
 Urbos 3 (Metrocentro de Sevilla, Tranvía de Zaragoza, Metropolitano de Granada, Metro de Málaga and Tranvía Metropolitano de la Bahía de Cádiz).

Outside Spain: trains 

 Algeria: DMUs
 Argentina: 9 articulated units for Tren de la Costa
 Brazil: CPTM EMUs and São Paulo Metrô
 Germany: Commuter train NEXIO for Schönbuch Railway
 Hungary: MÁV vagon
 Italy: DMUs for Sardinia
 Netherlands: Sprinter New Generation for the Nederlandse Spoorwegen.
 Portugal: EMUs (UQE´S) for Lisboa
 Saudi Arabia: SAR/SRO Diesel Push-Pull Trainsets
 UK: British Rail Class 331 (Northern Trains)
 UK: British Rail Class 332 in partnership with Siemens (Heathrow Express)
 UK: British Rail Class 333 in partnership with Siemens (Arriva Trains Northern)
 UK: Northern Ireland Railways Class 3000 and Class 4000
 UK: British Rail Class 397 (TransPennine Express)

Newport factory, South Wales, UK

CAF Rolling Stock U.K. Ltd announced in 2017 its UK factory location was selected as Celtic Business Park at Llanwern steelworks in Newport, Wales. It has at least five confirmed UK projects from 2019 onwards and would have been the construction site for their unsuccessful bid to deliver stock for High Speed 2. The site was funded with support from the Welsh Government Inward Investment Programme.

 UK: CAF Oaris (Prospective bid for HS2)
 UK: British Rail Class 195 (Northern Trains)
 UK: British Rail Class 196 (West Midlands Trains)
 UK: British Rail Class 197 (Transport for Wales)

Outside Spain: metros and trams 

 Algeria: Algiers Metro
 Argentina: Buenos Aires Underground 5000 and 6000 series; Tren de la Costa
 Australia: Canberra, Newcastle and Sydney light rail.
 Belgium: Brussels Metro M6 and M7 Series
 Brazil: São Paulo Metro
 Brazil: Cuiabá tram
 Brazil: Recife Metro
 Canada: Calgary Transit Urbos 100 (On Order)
 Chile: Santiago Metro
 Colombia: Medellín Metro
 Estonia: Tallinn tram
 Finland: Helsinki Metro, M300 series
 France: Nantes Tramway
 France: Besançon Tramway
 Germany: Freiburg tram and Bonn Stadtbahn (on order)
 Hungary: Debrecen public transport
 Hungary: Budapest public transport
 India: Delhi Airport Metro Express
 Indonesia: Greater Jakarta LRT (built by INKA)
 Italy: Rome Metro
 Italy: Naples Metro
 Luxembourg: :fr:Tramway de Luxembourg Urbos 3
 Mexico: Mexico City Metro (NE-92, NM-02, FE-07, FE-10, NE-16)
 Mexico: Mexico City suburban rail
 Mexico: Toluca–Mexico City commuter rail (under construction) 
 Netherlands: S3 and M4 units of the Amsterdam Metro and from 2018 the Uithof tram line in Utrecht
 Norway: Oslo trams, delivery from 2022
 Philippines: Manila LRT Line 1
 Romania: Bucharest Metro Line M2
 Serbia: Belgrade Tram
 Sweden: Stockholm Tram
 Taiwan: Kaohsiung Tram
 Turkey: Antray(Antalya LRT)
 Turkey: Istanbul Metro
 UK: CAF DLR replacement programme (Docklands Light Railway, TfL)
 UK: New West Midlands Metro vehicles
 UK: Edinburgh Trams
 US: Light Rail of Sacramento, California Class 200
 US: Pittsburgh Light Rail, Pennsylvania Class 4300
 US: Washington Metro, 5000-Series
 US: METRORail, (Houston, TX)
 US: Kansas City Streetcar
 US: Cincinnati Streetcar
 US: MBTA Green Line Type 9 LRV and Type 10 (on order - delivery starting 2027)
 US: MTA Maryland Purple Line (On order)
 Venezuela: Caracas Metro

See also
 Karlos Arguiñano, a former worker at CAF who later became famous as a TV chef.
 Variable gauge axles
 List of rolling stock manufacturers

References

External links

 Official website 

 
Vehicle manufacturing companies established in 1917
Companies listed on the Madrid Stock Exchange
Basque companies
Locomotive manufacturers of Spain
Rolling stock manufacturers of Spain
Spanish brands
Rail infrastructure manufacturers
Conservative Party (UK) donors
Spanish companies established in 1917
Gipuzkoa